In algebra, Gauss's lemma, named after Carl Friedrich Gauss, is a statement about polynomials over the integers, or, more generally, over a unique factorization domain (that is, a ring that has a unique  factorization property similar to the fundamental theorem of arithmetic). Gauss's lemma underlies all the theory of factorization and greatest common divisors of such polynomials.

Gauss's lemma asserts that the product of two primitive polynomials is primitive (a polynomial with integer coefficients is primitive if it has 1 as a greatest common divisor of its coefficients).

A corollary of Gauss's lemma, sometimes also called Gauss's lemma, is that a primitive polynomial is irreducible over the integers if and only if it is irreducible over the rational numbers. More generally, a primitive polynomial has the same complete factorization over the integers and over the rational numbers. In the case of coefficients in a unique factorization domain , "rational numbers" must be replaced by "field of fractions of ". Another consequence is that factorization and greatest common divisor computation of polynomials with integers or rational coefficients may be reduced to similar computations on integers and primitive polynomials. This is systematically used (explicitly or implicitly) in all implemented algorithms (see Polynomial greatest common divisor and Factorization of polynomials).

Gauss's lemma, and all its consequences that do not involve the existence of a complete factorization remain true over any GCD domain (an integral domain over which greatest common divisors exist). In particular, a polynomial ring over a GCD domain is also a GCD domain. If one calls primitive a polynomial such that the coefficients  generate the unit ideal, Gauss's lemma is true over every commutative ring. However, some care must be taken when using this definition of primitive, as, over a unique factorization domain that is not a principal ideal domain, there are polynomials that are primitive in the above sense and not primitive in this new sense.

The lemma over the integers 
If  is a polynomial with integer coefficients, then  is called primitive if the greatest common divisor of all the coefficients  is 1; in other words, no prime number divides all the coefficients.

Proof:  Clearly the product f(x)g(x) of two primitive polynomials has integer coefficients.  Therefore, if it is not primitive, there must be a prime p which is a common divisor of all its coefficients. But p can not divide all the coefficients of either f(x) or g(x) (otherwise they would not be primitive).  Let arxr be the first term of f(x) not divisible by p and let bsxs be the first term of g(x) not divisible by p.  Now consider the term xr+s in the product, whose coefficient is

The term arbs is not divisible by p (because p is prime), yet all the remaining ones are, so the entire sum cannot be divisible by p.  By assumption all coefficients in the product are divisible by p, leading to a contradiction. Therefore, the coefficients of the product can have no common divisor and are thus primitive. 

The proof is given below for the more general case. Note that an irreducible element of Z (a prime number) is still irreducible when viewed as constant polynomial in Z[X]; this explains the need for "non-constant" in the statement.

Statements for unique factorization domains 

Gauss's lemma holds more generally over arbitrary unique factorization domains.

More generally, the content of a product  of polynomials is the product  of their individual contents.

Irreducibility statement: Let  be a unique factorization domain and  its field of fractions.

(For the proofs, see #General version below.)

Let  be a unique factorization domain with field of fractions . The procedure is compatible with product: .

The construct can be used to show the statement:
A polynomial ring over a UFD is a UFD.
Indeed, by induction, it is enough to show  is a UFD when  is a UFD. Let  be a non-zero polynomial.

Hence,  admits a prime factorization (or a unique factorization into irreducibles).

The condition that "R is a unique factorization domain" is not superfluous because it implies that every irreducible element of this ring is also a prime element, which in turn implies that every non-zero element of R has at most one factorization into a product of irreducible elements and a unit up to order and associate relationship. In a ring where factorization is not unique, say  with p and q irreducible elements that do not divide any of the factors on the other side, the product  shows the failure of the primitivity statement. In this example the polynomial  (obtained by dividing the right hand side by ) provides an example of the failure of the irreducibility statement (it is irreducible over R, but reducible over its field of fractions ). Another well-known example is the polynomial , whose roots are the golden ratio  and its conjugate  showing that it is reducible over the field , although it is irreducible over the non-UFD  which has  as field of fractions.

General version 
Let  be a commutative ring. The next proposition states a more substantial property.

A polynomial  is said to be primitive if  is the unit ideal . When  (or more generally when  is a Bézout domain), this agrees with the usual definition of a primitive polynomial. (But if  is only a UFD, this definition is inconsistent with the definition of primitivity in #Statements for unique factorization domains.)

Proof: This is easy using the fact that  implies  

Then . From this, using the proposition, we get:
.
That is,  divides .

Proof of the proposition: Clearly, . If  is a prime ideal containing , then  modulo . Since  is a polynomial ring over an integral domain and thus is an integral domain, this implies either  or  modulo .

We now prove the "moreover" part. The rest of the proof is easy and transparent if  is a unique factorization domain; thus we give the proof in that case here (and see  for the proof for the GCD case). If , then there is nothing to prove. Factorizing that element into a product of prime elements, we can take that element to be a prime element . Now, we have:
.

Applications 
It follows from Gauss's lemma that for each unique factorization domain , the polynomial ring  is also a unique factorization domain (see #Statements for unique factorization domains). Gauss's lemma can also be used to show Eisenstein's irreducibility criterion. Finally, it can be used to show that cyclotomic polynomials (unitary units with integer coefficients) are irreducible.

Gauss's lemma implies the following statement:
If , then it says a rational root of a monic polynomial over integers is an integer (cf. the rational root theorem). Then

Since  is monic, this is possible only when  is a unit.

A similar argument shows:

The irreducibility statement also implies that the minimal polynomial over the rational numbers of an algebraic integer has integer coefficients.

Notes

References 

Theorems about polynomials
Theorems in ring theory
Lemmas in algebra